Morphia was a Dutch symphonic death/doom metal band formed in 1995. Having performed concerts with groups such as After Forever, Epica, Autumn, Orphanage and Imperia, Morphia established themselves as one of the more prominent symphonic doom metal bands in the Netherlands. Signed to Dutch Fear Dark Records, Morphia has released 3 studio albums, musically evolving from death metal to gothic doom over the years. The band name comes from morphine, a medical drug used to relieve pain, but it is also a reference to Morpheus, the principal god of dreams in the Greek mythology.

Biography
In 1995, Werner Wensink (vocals/bass),Bert Bonestroo (mixer), Martin Koedoot (guitar), Roger Koedoot (guitar), Ernst Jan Lemmen (drums), and Peter Tulder (keyboards) formed Morphia as a death metal band, which evolved over time to symphonic doom metal. In 1997, they released a demo CD titled Poison Minded. In 1998, they recorded their first album titled Unfulfilled Dreams, which was  published in 1999.

After attaining some success, the singer Werner left the band. When Jasper Pieterson joined as a singer for the band, they wrote new songs, and recorded them in 2001 for the second album titled Frozen Dust. Morphia signed a record deal with the Dutch label Fear Dark which released the album in 2002. Over the time Morphia played with well-known groups such as After Forever and Saviour Machine. In November 2004, the band released their third album titled Fading Beauty.

The band played their final show on November 22, 2008 at the Gigant in Apeldoorn as part of the Brainstorm Festival 2008. It was recorded on DVD, which was released in 2009.

Music
Morphia's take on metal is deep, emotional, and sleepy with varied tempos changing from slow to fast pace. The vocals emphasize on death growls. Additionally, there some clean vocals, usually in the background, and occasional screaming. A majority of the lyrics deal with topics such as pain, fear, affection and faith. The music ranges from complex to pompous to calm, sometimes incorporating violin and other symphonic elements.

Discography 
Poison Minded (1997)
Unfullfilled Dreams (1999)
Frozen Dust (2002)
Fading Beauty (2004)
One Last Embrace (2009)

Personnel
Last known line-up
Ernst-Jan Lemmen - drums (1995-2008)
Peter van Tulder - keyboards, vocals (1995-2008)
Jasper Pieterson - vocals, bass (2000-2008)
Martin Koedoot - guitar (1995-2008)
Vincent Eisen - guitar (2005-2008)

Previous members
Roger Koedoot - guitar (1995–2005)
Erik van Tulder - bass (1999–2005)
Werner Wensink - vocals, bass (1995–1999)

Session members
Esther Wertwijn - violin on "Meaning of Forever II", "Memories Never Die", "Fading Beauty" and "One Last Embrace"

Timeline

References

External links
Official MySpace

Dutch doom metal musical groups
Dutch symphonic metal musical groups
Dutch gothic metal musical groups
Musical groups established in 1995
Musical groups disestablished in 2008
Dutch heavy metal musical groups
1995 establishments in the Netherlands
2008 disestablishments in the Netherlands